Zinc is a town near the east-central edge of Boone County, Arkansas, United States. The population was 92 at the 2020 census. It is part of the Harrison Micropolitan Statistical Area. A chapter of the Ku Klux Klan operates in Zinc.

History

Zinc mining in the area gave the town its name. Zinc and lead mining began in the 1890s and peaked during World War I (1914–1918). A post office was established in Zinc in 1900 and the town was incorporated in 1904.

The town had a number of business establishments and a school in the 1920s, but a flood in 1927 caused damage to homes and businesses. Zinc's population was 188 in 1930 and declined thereafter. The last store closed in Zinc in the late 1960s and the post office closed in 1975.

Zinc, in the 21st century, became the headquarters of a chapter of the Knights of the Ku Klux Klan (KKK), classified as a hate group by the Anti-Defamation League and the Southern Poverty Law Center The "Christian Revival Center" near Zinc belongs to a preacher named Thomas Robb who is also the leader of the Knights of the KKK. The center hosts events connected with the KKK, including in 2013 a "Klan Kamp" called the "Soldiers of the Cross Training Institute" to instill "the tools to become actively involved" in the "struggle for our racial redemption".

Other activities of the KKK near Zinc include the placement of signs along highways with messages such as "Diversity is a code for #whitegenocide".

In May 2022, English YouTuber Niko Omilana published a video documenting his experiences in Zinc and Harrison whilst disguising himself as a journalist for the BBC. The video includes an interview with Thomas Robb, where Robb unknowingly shouts out fake Instagram users whose names phoneticize phrases such as "BLM".

National Historic Sites

Two National Historic Sites are located in the town: the Elliott and Anna Barham House and the Zinc Swinging Bridge.

Geography
Zinc is located at  (36.285384, −92.915419), approximately nine miles east in straight-line distance from the county seat of Harrison.

Demographics
As of the census of 2010, there were 103 people, 37 households, and 23 families residing in the town. The population density was 39.1/km2 (101.8/mi2). There were 35 housing units at an average density of 18.0/km2 (46.9/mi2). The racial makeup of the town was 88.3% White, 1% Black or African American, and 8.7% from two or more races. 1.9% of the population were Hispanic or Latino of any race.

There were 37 households, out of which 64.5% had children under the age of 18 living with them, 45.2% were married couples living together, 16.1% had a female householder with no husband present, and 22.6% were non-families. 19.4% of all households were made up of individuals, and 3.2% had someone living alone who was 65 years of age or older. The average household size was 2.45 and the average family size was 2.79.

In the town, the population was spread out, with 18.4% under the age of 18, 6.6% from 18 to 24, 25.0% from 25 to 44, 38.2% from 45 to 64, and 11.8% who were 65 years of age or older. The median age was 45 years. For every 100 females, there were 145.2 males. For every 100 females age 18 and over, there were 148.0 males.

The median income for a household in the town was $20,036, and the median income for a family was $18,250. Males had a median income of $10,194 versus $5,250 for females. The per capita income for the town was $9,999. There were 35.8% of families and 25.9% of the population living below the poverty line, including 43.0% of under eighteens and 63.7% of those over 64.

School district
Zinc, along with Bergman, is within the Bergman School District.

See also

 List of towns in Arkansas

References

External links

 Map of Zinc (US Census Bureau)
 Boone County Historical and Railroad Society, Inc.
 Bergman School District
 Town government information
 Detailed 2000 US Census statistics
 Boone County School District Reference Map (US Census Bureau, 2010)

Towns in Boone County, Arkansas
Towns in Arkansas
Harrison, Arkansas micropolitan area